The Chaise 4B is an aircraft engine designed and built in France during the 1930s, unusual in being an inverted air-cooled 14º  V-4.

Design and development
During the early 1930s Societe Anonyme Omnium Metallurgique et Industriel / Etablissements Chaise et Cie, commonly known as Moteurs Chaise, designed and produced a compact lightweight four-cylinder aircraft engine developing . To reduce overall dimensions and length of crankshaft Chaise designed an inverted V-4 with a very small vee angle of  14º. With staggered banks the 4B was both narrow and short.

The light alloy (R.R.50) crankcase supported the major components of the engine. Heat treated steel cylinders were bolted to the crankcase and light alloy (R.R.50) cylinder heads were screwed onto the barrels. Accessories were mounted at the rear with magnetos driven by camshafts running either side of the crankcase, which also operated the valves by pushrods and rocker arms with triple concentric return springs.

Variants
4B Standard production engine
4Ba the 4B with improvements

Specifications (4B)

References

1930s aircraft piston engines
Air-cooled aircraft piston engines
Inverted aircraft piston engines
Chaise aircraft engines